The National Radio Systems Committee (NRSC) is an organization sponsored by the Consumer Technology Association (CTA) and the National Association of Broadcasters (NAB).  Its main purpose is to set industry technical standards for radio broadcasting in the United States.  While regulatory authority rests with the FCC, it usually adopts NRSC recommendations, such as RBDS and spectral masks.  For U.S. television, the NTSC sets standards.

Standards
NRSC-1: AM Preemphasis/Deemphasis and Broadcast Audio Transmission Bandwidth; see AMAX
NRSC-2: Emission Limitation for Analog AM Broadcast Transmission; see Spectral mask
NRSC-4: United States Radio Broadcast Data System (RBDS)
NRSC-5: In-band/on-channel Digital Radio Broadcasting Standard; see HD Radio

External links

Standards organizations in the United States
Radio organizations in the United States